An inn is an establishment where travelers can procure food, drink and lodging.

Inn can also refer to:

 Inn (river), which flows through Switzerland, Austria and Germany
 Inn (district of Switzerland), a district in Switzerland named for the river Inn
 Inner automorphism, in mathematics, a set of functions on groups
 Inns of Court, London, England, institutions
 InterNetNews, Usenet News server
 Frank Inn, American animal trainer (1916–2002)

See also 
 INN (disambiguation), as a three-letter acronym
 In, another word with the same pronunciation